Since 1920, the Baltimore Police Department has been led by a single commissioner. Prior to this, it was led by a multi-member board of commissioners.

Commissioners of the Baltimore Police Department

Presidents of the Board of Police Commissioners
Before 1920, the department was led by a multi-member Board of Police Commissioners. This board was led by a president.

Police commissioners since 1920

List of members by name
The following is a list of all of those who served as members of the former board of commissioners. Periods as board president are also noted in itallics:
Daniel C. Ammidon (April 4, 1912–1920) –president December 28, 1914 – March 22, 1916
Alfred J. Carr (June 25, 1886–January 23, 1888)
James E. Carr (March 1867–March 15, 1871)
C. Baker Clotworthy (May 2, 1910–April 4, 1912)
George Colton (March 15, 1881–March 15, 1887) -president March 15, 1881 – March 15, 1887
John W. Davis (1850–1861; March 14, 1870–March 15, 1871) –chair March 14, 1870 – March 15, 1871
J. D. Ferguson (August 5, 1884–February 25, 1886)
Edward H. Fowler (May 7, 1900–March 23, 1904)
John Gill Jr. (January 23, 1888–March 15, 1897)
Clarendon I. T. Gould (December 28, 1914–March 22, 1916)
William H. B. Fusselbaugh (March 1867–March 15, 1881) -president March 15, 1871 – March 15, 1881
William H. Gatchell (1850–1861)
Harry Gilmor (March 15, 1875–April 12, 1878)
Daniel C. Heddinger (March 27, 1896–May 7, 1900) –president March 15, 1897 – May 7, 1900
James R. Herbert (April 12, 1878–August 5, 1884)
Samuel Hindes (March 29, 1862–November 15, 1866) -president March 29, 1862 – November 15, 1866
Charles D. Hinks (1850–1861)
Charles Howard	 (1850–1861) -president 1850–1860
LeFevre Jarrett (March 1867–March 14, 1870) –president March 1867–March 14, 1870
William W. Johnson (March 15, 1897–May 7, 1900)
Thomas Kelso (June 22, 1861–March 29, 1862 )
John R. Kelso (June 22, 1861–March 29, 1862 )
John C. Legg (December 1, 1894–March 27, 1896)
James McEvoy (December 31, 1913–December 28, 1914) –president December 31, 1913 – December 28, 1914
John Milroy (March 15, 1875 – March 15, 1877; April 12, 1878 – June 25, 1886)
John T. Morris (May 7, 1900 – May 2, 1904)
Thomas W. Morse (March 15, 1871 – March 15, 1875)
Alfred S. Niles (May 6, 1912 – May 1, 1916)
Columbus O'Donnell (June 22, 1861 – March 29, 1862 )
James H. Preston (May 2, 1904 – May 4, 1908)
John W. Randolph (June 22, 1861 – March 29, 1862 )
Lawrason Riggs (March 22, 1916 – 1920) –president May 1, 1916–1920
Joseph Roberts (June 22, 1861 – March 29, 1862 )
John Q. A. Robson (February 25, 1886 – December 1, 1894)
Peter Sauerwein (June 22, 1861 – March 29, 1862 )
John B. Seidenstricker (June 22, 1861 – March 29, 1862 )
Archibald Sterling Jr. (June 22, 1861 – March 29, 1862 )
Edson M. Schryver (March 15, 1887 – May 7, 1900) –president March 15, 1887–March 15, 1897
Thomas J. Shryock (March 23, 1904 – May 4, 1908)
George A. Solter (1910–1914)
Morris Ames Soper (April 4, 1912 – December 31, 1913) –president May 6, 1912–December 31, 1913 
Peter E. Tome (May 4, 1908 – May 6, 1912)
Michael Warner (June 22, 1861 – March 29, 1862 )
George R. Willis (May 2, 1904 – May 4, 1908) –president May 2, 1904–May 4, 1908
John B. A. Wheltle (May 4, 1908 – May 6, 1912) –president May 2, 1910–1912
Nicholas L. Wood (March 29, 1862 – November 15, 1866) -president 1850–1860
George M. Upshur (May 7, 1900 – May 2, 1904) –president 1900-1904
William T. Valiant (November 15, 1866–March 1867)
James Young (November 15, 1866–March 1867)

Mayors that served as ex-officio members
John Hanson Thomas Jerome (1850–1852)
John Smith Hollins (1852–1854)
Samuel Hinks (1854–1856)
Thomas Swann (1856–1860)
George William Brown (1860–1861)
John L. Chapman (1862–1867)

References